Ontario (Human Rights Commission) v Simpsons-Sears Ltd, [1985] 2 SCR 536 is a leading decision by the Supreme Court of Canada, which first acknowledged the existence of indirect discrimination through conduct that creates prejudicial effect.

Background
Theresa O'Malley was a Seventh-day Adventist who was employed by the retailer Simpsons-Sears. As part of her religion, she was forbidden from working from sundown on Friday to sundown on Saturday. There were no full-time shifts available that did not require work on Friday and Saturday and so the company terminated her employment.

Simpsons-Sears argued that by requiring all its employees to work Fridays and Saturdays, it was not intentionally trying to discriminate against her, but it was a neutral requirement it imposed on all employees.

The issue before the Supreme Court was whether the requirement for all employees to work on Friday and Saturday was discriminatory against her religion.

Decision
McIntyre J, writing for a unanimous Court, held Simpons-Sears had discriminated against O'Malley. Despite the reasonable basis for the requirement, the company had not tried to make any changes to the work schedule to accommodate O'Malley's religious requirements.

See also
 Central Okanagan School District No 23 v Renaud

External links
 

Canadian civil rights case law
Supreme Court of Canada cases
History of the Seventh-day Adventist Church
Labour relations in Canada
1985 in Canadian case law
Religious discrimination